The Armuelles Formation is a geologic formation in Costa Rica and Panama. It preserves fossils.

Fossil content 
 Axelella nutrita - Panama

See also 
 List of fossiliferous stratigraphic units in Costa Rica
 List of fossiliferous stratigraphic units in Panama

References

Bibliography 
 

Geologic formations of Costa Rica
Pleistocene Costa Rica
Geologic formations of Panama
Pleistocene Panama
Paleontology in Panama
Siltstone formations
Formations
Formations